Senator Vázquez may refer to:

Eddie Zavála Vázquez, Senate of Puerto Rico
Evelyn Vázquez, Senate of Puerto Rico